Agelas gracilis, commonly known as candy cane sponge, is a species of demosponge. It lives primarily in Australian waters. It has a symbiotic relationship with the white zoanthid making red and white polyps.

References

External links

Agelasida